Steven "Steve" McAdam (2 April 1960 – 21 February 2004) was a professional footballer from Northern Ireland, who played as a full-back.

References

1960 births
2004 deaths
People from Portadown
Association footballers from Northern Ireland
Association football defenders
Burnley F.C. players
Oldham Athletic A.F.C. players
Barnsley F.C. players
Wigan Athletic F.C. players
English Football League players